The Bengals–Browns rivalry, often referred to as the Battle of Ohio, is a rivalry between the Cincinnati Bengals and Cleveland Browns of the National Football League (NFL).  Both teams are members of the American Football Conference (AFC) North Division, and play two games against each other annually.

Geography and a shared heritage add to this rivalry. Cleveland (Northeast) and Cincinnati (Southwest) are on opposite corners of Ohio, and essentially split Ohio. Both teams were founded by head coach Paul Brown, the namesake of the Browns franchise, who created the Bengals franchise in the American Football League (AFL) after he was fired from the Browns. The colors of each team are similar.

The Bengals and Browns first played in 1970. Previously, the Bengals were a part of the AFL. After the AFL–NFL merger the Bengals and Browns were placed in the AFC Central Division, where they remained until the Browns suspended operations after their relocation to Baltimore and a subsequent new Browns expansion team being awarded to Cleveland. The expansion Browns were also placed in the AFC Central.  Both teams moved to the newly formed AFC North division in 2002 as part of the NFL's realignment.

The Bengals lead the overall series, 52–47.  The two teams have never met in the postseason.

History

Early history
The Browns were founded in 1946 as a member of the All-America Football Conference (AAFC), and were named after their head coach, Paul Brown.

The Browns dominated the AAFC in its four years of existence, winning all four Championships, and joined the NFL in 1950, playing in the next six Championship Games for three Championships, or seven in ten years (including five in succession in 1946–1950).

In 1963, Brown was fired by new team owner Art Modell, and subsequently went on to found the Bengals, who played their first AFL season in 1968. 

Two years later, after the AFL-NFL merger, both the Bengals and the Browns were placed in the AFC Central, and thus met twice every season: fueled by the hatred between Brown and Modell, a rivalry was born.

1970–79  The first meetings 
In the first regular-season matchup between the two teams, the Browns beat the Bengals 30–27. It was an important win for the Browns, who were chastised for losing a preseason game to Cincinnati. Running backs Leroy Kelly and Bo Scott combined for 236 yards, and a fired up defense set the early tone when defensive tackle Walter Johnson sacked Bengals quarterback Virgil Carter for a safety.  However, the Bengals got the last laugh that season, beating the Browns in their first meeting in Cincinnati, 14–10.  This win helped propel the Bengals, who won their final seven games, to win the AFC Central by one game over the Browns.

Each team had limited success in the 1970s, with the Bengals making three playoff appearances and the Browns making two.  Neither team won a playoff game in the decade.  The teams split the 20 games during the 1970s, each winning 10.

1980–90 Playoff contenders 
Both teams had several playoff runs throughout the 1980s. 

The Bengals appeared in two Super Bowls during the decade (XVI and XXIII), losing both to the San Francisco 49ers. The Browns played in three AFC Championship games during the decade, but lost all of them to the Denver Broncos.

Prior to the 1980 season, the Bengals hired former Browns head coach Forrest Gregg.  The Browns beat Gregg and the Bengals in both meetings that year, including a division-clinching 27–24 win in Cincinnati.

Because of the 1982 NFL players strike, the game in Cleveland that season was cancelled. The Bengals won the only meeting of the year in Cincinnati, 23–10: this marks the only season to date in which the Browns and Bengals did not meet twice.

On December 14, 1986, the Browns routed the Bengals 34–3 at Riverfront Stadium to clinch the AFC Central division title.  The Browns and Bengals battled for the division title throughout the late 1980s, with the Browns winning the AFC Central title in 1986, 1987, and 1989; the Bengals won the division in 1988 and 1990.

On December 10, 1989, during a Bengals home game against the Seattle Seahawks, Bengals fans booed and threw snowballs and various other objects onto the field, at Seahawks players and officials, and at game officials in response to questionable calls. The Seahawks were deep in their own territory, and citing safety concerns, refused to continue play until the field was cleared. Bengals head coach Sam Wyche got on the stadium's public address system and told the fans: "Will the next person that sees anybody throw anything onto this field, point them out, and get them out of here. You don't live in Cleveland, you live in Cincinnati!" 

Paul Brown owned the Bengals until his death in August 1991: at the time, his Bengals held a 22–19 record against his former team.

1991-95 Browns' dominance and move 
Under head coach Bill Belichick, the Browns dominated the series during these years, going 8–2, including a seven-game winning streak from 1992 to 1995.

On September 4, 1994, the teams opened the season at Riverfront Stadium. The Browns won the game, 28–20, highlighted by an Eric Metcalf 94-yard punt return for a touchdown, a Browns franchise record. The game featured the first successful two-point conversion in NFL history, when Cleveland punter Tom Tupa ran into the end zone on a fake extra point attempt.

On October 29, 1995, the Browns defeated the Bengals 29–26 in overtime.  Browns kicker Matt Stover kicked five field-goals for the Browns including the overtime game-winner.

On November 6, 1995, Modell announced his intention to relocate the Browns to Baltimore following the season: most of the team's sponsors pulled their support in response, leaving Cleveland Municipal Stadium devoid of advertising during the team's final weeks. 

The Browns defeated the Bengals in the final game played at Cleveland Municipal Stadium, 26–10, in the Browns' only win following the announcement of the move.

1999–2010  Browns' return and struggles for both teams 
The Browns returned to the NFL in 1999.  Both teams struggled throughout the next decade.  The Browns made a playoff appearance in 2002, while the Bengals made it to the playoffs in 2005 and 2009, although neither team won a playoff game during this time.  Both teams had years in which they finished with the worst record in the NFL (the Browns in 1999 and the Bengals in 2002), and thus were awarded the top pick in the following year's draft.

On October 10, the teams met for the first time since the Browns' return.  The Bengals won the game at the new Cleveland Browns Stadium, 18–17.  Rookie quarterback Akili Smith led the Bengals on a 12-play touchdown drive in the final 2:04 to deny the Browns their first win.  In that game, Browns kicker Phil Dawson scored a rushing touchdown on a fake field goal play.  On December 12, the Bengals defeated the Browns 44–28 in the last game at Riverfront Stadium (at the time renamed Cinergy Field).

The Browns and Bengals opened Paul Brown Stadium on September 10, 2000, a 24–7 Browns' win.

On December 28, 2003 in Cincinnati, the Browns defeated the Bengals 22–14, to knock the Bengals out of playoff contention in the final regular season game.

On November 28, 2004 in Cincinnati, the Bengals defeated the Browns 58–48.  The 106 combined points marked the second highest scoring game in NFL history (only behind a 1966 game in which the Washington Redskins defeated the New York Giants 72–41, a total of 113 points).  The game saw Bengals running back Rudi Johnson rush for 202 yards and Browns QB Kelly Holcomb pass for 413 yards and five touchdowns.  After that game, Browns' head coach Butch Davis resigned amid a long losing streak and disappointing 4–12 season.

The two teams were involved in another very high scoring game, on September 16, 2007, in Cleveland.  This time, the Browns were on the winning end, 51–45.  The 96 point total is the 11th-highest scoring total in NFL history.  In this game, Browns quarterback Derek Anderson passed for 328 yards and 5 touchdowns, while running back Jamal Lewis rushed for 216 yards.  On the other side, Bengals quarterback Carson Palmer passed for 401 yards and six touchdowns.  Chad Johnson, who caught two of the touchdown passes, had 209 yards receiving.

The Bengals won the rematch that year, 19–14, in Cincinnati.  The Browns entered that game at 9–5 and controlled their own playoff destiny.  However, Anderson threw four interceptions in the game, leading to most of the Bengals' points.  Despite winning their final game and finishing 10–6, the Browns missed the playoffs due to AFC tiebreakers.

On December 29, 2008, the Bengals defeated the Browns 14–0 in Cleveland.  This win gave the Bengals a 36–35 lead in the overall series, a lead the Bengals have not yet relinquished.

The Bengals swept the Browns in the 2009 season, while also sweeping the rest of the AFC North en route to a division title.  This is the Bengals' first division sweep in franchise history.

2011–2019 The Andy Dalton era 

In the 2011 NFL Draft, the Bengals took wide receiver A. J. Green and quarterback Andy Dalton with their first two picks.  Dalton made his first career start as a rookie in Cleveland, a 27–17 Bengals win, the first of many dominating performances.  Dalton has an 11–4 record against the Browns, passing for 27 touchdowns – seven of which went to Green – against 11 interceptions.

One exception to Dalton's dominance in the rivalry occurred on November 6, 2014, where the Browns defeated the Bengals 24–3 in Cincinnati.  Dalton posted a 2.0 quarterback rating, the worst game of his career.

The Bengals won seven meetings in a row from 2014 to 2017 by a combined score of 213–63.  The Bengals scored at least 30 points in six of the seven games, while the Browns have scored 17 or fewer points in each game.

In 2018, the Browns fired head coach Hue Jackson; Jackson had a 3–36–1 record, including the Browns finishing 0–16 in 2017. Cincinnati hired Jackson as special assistant to head coach, Marvin Lewis, less than a month later.  

In their first meeting of 2018, Browns rookie quarterback Baker Mayfield, making his eighth career start and his first start against the Bengals in week 12, passed for four touchdowns and led the Browns to a 35–20 win in Cincinnati.  In his second career start against the Bengals, Mayfield continued his dominance by throwing for 284 yards and three touchdowns in a Browns 26–18 victory in week 16, and also taunted Jackson by staring him down along the sideline.

2020–present 

The Browns under Kevin Stefanski were, until December 2022, undefeated against the Bengals since Joe Burrow was drafted first overall in 2020.  The Browns won the first five contests, with Burrow starting four of them for Cincinnati.  On December 11, 2022, Burrow led the Bengals to his first career victory over the Browns, besting them 23-10.

Season-by-season results 

|-
| 
| Tie 1–1
| style="| Bengals  14–10
| style="| Browns  30–27
| Tie  1–1
| AFL-NFL merger.  Both teams placed in AFC Central. Paul Brown, who was fired by the Browns and now the Bengals head coach, refused to shake Blanton Collier's hand after the inaugural meeting.
|-
| 
| style="| Browns 2–0
| style="| Browns  27–24
| style="| Browns  31–27
| Browns  3–1
|
|-
| 
| style="| Browns 2–0
| style="| Browns  27–24
| style="| Browns  27–6
| Browns  5–1
|
|-
| 
| Tie, 1–1
| style="| Bengals  34–17
| style="| Browns  17–10
| Browns   6–2
|
|-
| 
| style="| Bengals 2–0
| style="| Bengals  34–24
| style="| Bengals  33–7
| Browns   6–4
| 
|-
| 
| Tie 1–1
| style="| Bengals  24–17
| style="| Browns  35–23
| Browns  7–5
| 
|-
| 
| style="| Bengals 2–0
| style="| Bengals  21–6
| style="| Bengals  45–24
| Tie  7–7
| 
|-
| 
| Tie 1–1
| style="| Browns  13–3
| style="| Bengals  10–7
| Tie  8–8
| 
|-
| 
| Tie 1–1
| style="| Bengals  48–16
| style="| Browns  13–10 (OT)
| Tie  9–9
| 
|-
| 
| Tie 1–1
| style="| Bengals  16–12
| style="|Browns  28–27
| Tie   10–10
| 
|-

|-
| 
| style="|Browns 2–0
| style="| Browns  27–24
| style="| Browns  21–7
| Browns  12–10
| Former Browns head coach Forrest Gregg hired to coach the Bengals
|-
| 
| Tie 1–1
| style="| Browns  20–17
| style="| Bengals  41–21
| Browns  13–11
| Bengals lose Super Bowl XVI
|-
| 
| style="| Bengals 1–0
| style="| Bengals  23–10
| no game
| Browns  13–12
| Game in Cleveland was cancelled as a result of the nine-week players' strike.
|-
| 
| Tie, 1–1
| style="| Bengals  28–21
| style="| Browns  17–7
| Browns   14–13
|
|-
| 
| style="| Bengals 2–0
| style="| Bengals  12–9
| style="| Bengals  20–17(OT)
| Bengals  15–14
| Browns' K Steve Cox hit a 60-yard field goal at Cincinnati, a Browns franchise record
|-
| 
| Tie 1–1
| style="| Bengals  27–10
| style="| Browns  24–6
| Bengals  16–15
| 
|-
| 
| Tie 1–1
| style="| Browns  34–3
| style="| Bengals  30–13
| Bengals  17–16
| 
|-
| 
| style="| Browns 2–0
| style="| Browns  34–0
| style="| Browns  38–24
| Browns  18–17
| 
|-
| 
| Tie 1–1
| style="| Bengals  24–17
| style="| Browns  23–16
| Browns   19–18
| Bengals lose Super Bowl XXIII
|-
| 
| style="| Bengals 2–0
| style="| Bengals  21–14
| style="| Bengals  21–0
| Bengals  20–19
| 
|-

|-
| 
| style="|Bengals 2–0
| style="| Bengals  21–14
| style="| Bengals  34–13
| Bengals  22–19
| 
|-
| 
| Tie 1–1
| style="| Bengals  23–21
| style="| Browns  14–13
| Bengals  23–20
|
|-
| 
| Tie 1–1
| style="| Bengals  30–10
| style="| Browns  37–21
| Bengals  24–21
| 
|-
| 
| style="| Browns 2–0
| style="| Browns  28–17
| style="| Browns  27–14
| Bengals  24–23
|
|-
| 
| style="| Browns 2–0
| style="| Browns  28–20
| style="| Browns  37–13
| Browns  25–24
| Browns' Eric Metcalf has a 92-yard punt return touchdown in Cincinnati, a Browns franchise record
|-
| 
| style="| Browns 2–0
| style="| Browns  29–26(OT)
| style="| Browns  26–10
| Browns  27–24
| Game in Cleveland was the final game played at Cleveland Municipal Stadium and the last meeting before the Browns moved to Baltimore
|-
|colspan="6" |No games from 1996-1998 as the Browns suspended operations
|-
| 
| style="|Bengals 2–0
| style="| Bengals  44–28
| style="| Bengals  18–17
| Browns  27–26
| Browns return to the NFL and open Cleveland Browns Stadium. Game in Cleveland was the first meeting between the Bengals and the expansion Browns.  Bengals rookie QB Akili Smith led a late game-winning drive.  Game in Cincinnati was the final game played at Riverfront Stadium. 
|-

|-
| 
| Tie 1–1
| style="| Browns  24–7
| style="| Bengals  12–3
| Browns  28–27
| Bengals open Paul Brown Stadium
|-
| 
| Tie 1–1
| style="| Bengals  24–14
| style="| Browns  18–0
| Browns  29–28
| 
|-
| 
| style="| Browns 2–0
| style="| Browns  27–20
| style="| Browns  20–7
| Browns  31–28
| 
|-
| 
| Tie 1–1
| style="| Browns  24–14
| style="| Bengals  21–14
| Browns  32–29
| Browns win in Cincinnati the final game of the season to knock the Bengals out of the playoffs
|-
| 
| Tie 1–1
| style="| Bengals  58–48
| style="| Browns  34–17
| Browns  33–30
| 58–48 game in Cincinnati is the second-highest scoring game in NFL history (106 points)
|-
| 
| style="|Bengals 2–0
| style="| Bengals  23–20
| style="| Bengals  27–13
| Browns  33–32
| 
|-
| 
| style="|Bengals 2–0
| style="| Bengals  34–17
| style="| Bengals  30–0
| Bengals   34–33
| 
|-
| 
| Tie 1–1
| style="| Bengals  19–14
| style="| Browns  51–45
| Bengals  35–34
| 51-45 game in Cleveland is the 11th-highest scoring game in NFL history (96 points).  Browns would have clinched a playoff berth with a win in the Week 16 game in Cincinnati, however QB Derek Anderson threw four interceptions en route to a Bengals win
|-
| 
| Tie 1–1
| style="| Browns  20–12
| style="| Bengals  14–0
| Bengals  36–35
| 
|-
| 
| style="|Bengals 2–0
| style="| Bengals  16–7
| style="| Bengals  23–20(OT)
| Bengals  38–35
| Bengals win all of their division game for the first time in franchise history
|-

|-
| 
| Tie 1–1
| style="| Bengals  19–17
| style="| Browns  23–20
| Bengals  39–36
| 
|-
| 
| style="|Bengals 2–0
| style="| Bengals  23–20
| style="| Bengals  27–17
| Bengals  41–36
| Game in Cleveland was Andy Dalton's first career start
|-
| 
| Tie 1–1
| style="| Bengals  34–27
| style="| Browns  34–24
| Bengals  42–37
| 
|-
| 
| Tie 1–1
| style="| Bengals  41–20
| style="| Browns  17–6
| Bengals  43–38
| Bengals scored 31 points in the 2nd quarter of the game in Cincinnati, a franchise record for points in a quarter
|-
| 
| Tie 1–1
| style="| Browns  24–3
| style="| Bengals  30–0
| Bengals  44–39
| The Browns' first win in Cincinnati since 2008 moved them to 6–3 on the season and put them in first place in the AFC North.  Andy Dalton had a 2.0 passer rating in that game.
|-
| 
| style="|Bengals 2–0
| style="| Bengals  31–10
| style="| Bengals  37–3
| Bengals  46–39
| 
|-
| 
| style="|Bengals 2–0
| style="| Bengals  31–17
| style="| Bengals  23–10
| Bengals  48–39
| 
|-
| 
| style="|Bengals 2–0
| style="| Bengals  30–16
| style="| Bengals  31–7
| Bengals  50–39
| Browns complete the second 0–16 season in NFL history. Bengals win 7 straight meetings from 2014 to 2017.
|-
| 
| style="|Browns 2–0
| style="| Browns  35–20
| style="| Browns  26–18
| Bengals  50–41
| Browns fire head coach Hue Jackson mid-season.  Jackson, a former assistant in Cincinnati, is promptly hired by the Bengals as a special assistant to head coach Marvin Lewis. Browns sweep Bengals for the first time since 2002.
|-
| 
| Tie 1–1
| style="| Bengals  33–23
| style="| Browns  27–19
| Bengals  51–42
| 
|-

|-
| 
| style="|Browns 2–0
| style="| Browns  37–34
| style="| Browns  35–30
| Bengals  51–44
| The teams combined for five go-ahead touchdown passes in the game in Cincinnati, setting an NFL record.
|-
| 
| style="|Browns 2–0
| style="| Browns  41–16
|  style="| Browns  21–16
| Bengals  51–46
| Bengals lose Super Bowl LVI.
|-
| 
| Tie 1–1
| style="| Bengals  23–10
| style="| Browns  32–13 
| Bengals  52–47
|
|- 

|-
| Regular Season
| style="|Bengals 52–47
| Bengals 32–18
| Browns 29–20
| 
|-

See also
Other rivalries involving teams from Cincinnati and Cleveland
 Ohio Cup (Guardians–Reds)

Other rivalries involving the two teams
Bengals–Ravens rivalry
Bengals–Steelers rivalry
Browns–Ravens rivalry
Browns–Steelers rivalry

References 

Recap, 2004 Bengals 58 Browns 48
Bengals All-Time Results vs. Browns

National Football League rivalries
Cincinnati Bengals
Cleveland Browns
American football in Ohio
1970 establishments in Ohio
Cincinnati Bengals rivalries
Cleveland Browns rivalries